Tevita Taufoʻou (born 4 June 1959) is a Tongan boxer. He competed in the men's heavyweight event at the 1984 Summer Olympics.

References

External links
 

1959 births
Living people
Heavyweight boxers
Tongan male boxers
Olympic boxers of Tonga
Boxers at the 1984 Summer Olympics
Place of birth missing (living people)